Flow Hive is a beehive brand that has a unique honey frame designed to allow honey extraction without needing to open the beehive. During extraction, visibly bees are disturbed less than during other methods.

Design

The honey frames contain a partially-formed honeycomb with vertical gaps that is made of a plastic free of both BPA and BPS. These honey frames are for use in the Langstroth hive compartment commonly called honey super that is intended for accumulation of honey by bees. Bees fill in these vertical gaps with wax to complete cells, and then fill these cells with honey before covering them with wax. When the mechanism of a frame is activated by inserting and turning a crank mechanically, the vertical gaps are offset by one half of a cell. This breaks the wax covering and allows the honey to flow down through the cells into a channel at the base of each frame and out into a collection vessel, obviating the need for extraction equipment such as centrifuges and filters. After the frame is reset, the bees remove the broken covering, and repair and refill the cells.

Flow Hive honey frames comprise more plastic and plastic surface than the plastic foundations used commonly in conventional modern beekeeping. However, the brood chamber located in the Flow Hive below the honey super may contain hive frames that intend bees to make brood comb entirely from their own wax.

Patents for the Flow Hive cover all designs that have split cells to drain honey. A company called TapComb that infringed on these patents ceased trading in late 2018.

Crowdfunding
The Flow Hive design was invented in Australia by Cedar Anderson and his father Stuart Anderson. In February 2015, they launched a campaign on crowdfunding platform Indiegogo hoping to raise A$70,000 for a custom injection mould. Instead, they raised over $12 million and received nearly 25,000 orders from over 130 countries. The campaign broke several records for Indiegogo, becoming its most successful campaign as of that time.

The Flow Hive 2, which includes a number of small improvements, was launched using another crowdfunding campaign in early 2018.

Criticism

There were speculative criticisms of the design made by beekeeping journalists and bloggers during the first Indiegogo campaign.
 Use of plastic comb: Some have criticized the use of plastic combs in the Flow Hive; however,  plastic foundations are commonly used in conventional beekeeping today. In addition the Flow Hive uses a food-certified plastic in the honey super only which allows the bees to produce their own natural wax comb in the brood nest. This also allows for a healthy blend of traditional and modernized beekeeping as well as maintaining a food safe system.
 Crystallization: Especially in colder climates, honey can thicken or crystallize, preventing honey from flowing. If this prevents operation of the Flow Hive mechanism, it can be addressed by either waiting for the bees to remove the crystallized honey, or by soaking the frame in water to dissolve it away. 
 Promotion as 'honey on tap': In the first advertisements for the Flow Hive, it was marketed as a way to remove honey "without disturbing the bees". Many experienced beekeepers took issue with this, as they said it promoted a lack of maintenance of hives. Bee hives require regular maintenance and observation to check for diseases and other problems that might arise. Cedar Anderson responded to the criticism, changing the way that the Flow Hive was marketed, and specifying that all that changes with the Flow Hive system is the process of harvesting of honey, and that the rest of the beekeeping process should remain the same.

Reception
In Australia, a rapid increase in new members joining existing beekeeping clubs in 2017, the capping of new memberships by some clubs, and the establishment of at least one new club were attributed to the Flow Hive.

Effects 
A study comparing Langstroth hives to the Flow Hive has found no significant differences in the microbial populations of bees' bodies in these hives.

See also
Langstroth hive
Food contact materials
Microplastics

References

Agriculture in New South Wales
Australian inventions
Beehives
Beekeeping in Australia
Products introduced in 2015